Love Story is a 1970 American romantic drama film written by Erich Segal, who was also the author of the best-selling 1970 novel of the same name. It was produced by Howard G. Minsky and directed by Arthur Hiller and starred Ali MacGraw and Ryan O'Neal, alongside John Marley, Ray Milland, and Tommy Lee Jones in his film debut in a minor role.

The film is considered one of the most romantic by the American Film Institute (No. 9 on the list) and is one of the highest-grossing films of all time adjusted for inflation. It was followed by a sequel, Oliver's Story (1978), starring O'Neal with Candice Bergen.

Plot
Oliver Barrett IV, heir of an American upper-class East Coast family, attends Harvard College where he plays ice hockey. He meets Jennifer "Jenny" Cavilleri, a quick-witted, working-class Radcliffe College student of classical music; they fall in love despite their differences. At Cornell, Oliver loses his temper during the hockey game, and Harvard loses to Cornell, 4–3. His father drives all the way to Ithaca, NY, only to see Harvard lose the game and Ivy League title. Oliver then turns down his father's offer of a ride back to Boston and help getting into Harvard Law School.

Oliver is upset that he does not figure in Jenny's plans to study in Paris. She accepts his marriage proposal and he takes her to the Barrett mansion to meet his parents, who are judgmental and unimpressed. Oliver's father says he will cut him off financially if he marries Jenny, but after graduation they marry, nonetheless.

Jenny works as a teacher but without his father's financial support, the couple struggle to pay Oliver's way through Harvard Law School. Oliver graduates third in his class and takes a position at a respectable New York City law firm. They are ready to start a family but fail to conceive. After many tests Oliver is told that Jenny is terminally ill.

Oliver attempts to continue as normal without telling Jenny of her condition, but she confronts her doctor and finds out the truth. Oliver buys tickets to Paris, but she declines to go, wanting only to spend time with him. Oliver seeks money from his estranged father to pay for Jenny's cancer therapy. His father asks if he has "gotten a girl in trouble". Oliver says yes, and his father writes a check.

Jenny makes funeral arrangements with her father from her hospital bed. She tells Oliver to not blame himself, insisting that he never held her back from music and it was worth it for the love they shared. Jenny's last wish is for Oliver to embrace her tightly as she dies.

A grief-stricken Oliver leaves the hospital and he sees his father outside, who has rushed to New York City from Massachusetts to offer his help after learning about Jenny's condition. Oliver tells him, "Jenny's dead," and his father says "I'm sorry," to which Oliver responds, "Love Love means never having to say you're sorry", something that Jenny had said to him earlier. Oliver walks alone to the open air ice rink, where Jenny had watched him skate the day she was hospitalized.

Cast
 Ali MacGraw as Jennifer "Jenny" Cavilleri
 Ryan O'Neal as Oliver Barrett IV
 John Marley as Phil Cavilleri
 Ray Milland as Oliver Barrett III
 Russell Nype as Dean Thompson
 Katharine Balfour as Mrs. Barrett
 Sydney Walker as Dr. Shapeley
 Robert Modica as Dr. Addison
 Walker Daniels as Ray Stratton
 Tommy Lee Jones as Hank Simpson (credited as Tom Lee Jones)
 John Merensky as Steve
 Andrew Duncan as Reverend Blaufelt

Production
Erich Segal originally wrote the screenplay and sold it to Paramount Pictures. While the film was being produced, Paramount wanted Segal to write a novel based on it, to be published on Valentine's Day to help pre-publicize the release of the film. When the novel was released, it became a bestseller on its own in advance of the film.

The original director was Larry Peerce. He backed out and was replaced by Anthony Harvey. Harvey dropped out and was replaced by Arthur Hiller. Jimmy Webb wrote a score for the film that was not used.

The lead role of Oliver Barrett IV was refused by Jeff Bridges, Michael Douglas, Beau Bridges, Michael York and Jon Voight. Christopher Walken auditioned for the role, but Ryan O'Neal was cast on the recommendation of Erich Segal, who had worked with him on The Games; he was paid $25,000.

Bill Cleary, former Harvard and 1960 U.S. Olympic hockey star (and later Harvard's hockey coach/athletic director), was Ryan O'Neal's hockey stand-in during key hockey scenes where skating and hockey-playing ability were required. Hockey scenes were filmed in three days at Harvard's former Watson Rink, which was rebuilt and is now known as Bright-Landry Hockey Center. Other hockey players in the film were played mostly by actual Harvard and Boston University hockey players, including Joe Cavanagh and Mike Hyndman. 

Filming Love Story on location caused significant damage to the Harvard campus. This experience, followed by a similar experience with the film A Small Circle of Friends (1980), caused the university administration to deny most subsequent requests for filming on location.

The main song in the film, "(Where Do I Begin?) Love Story" was a major success, particularly the vocal rendition recorded by Andy Williams.

Release
The premiere for Love Story took place at Loews's State I theatre in New York City on Wednesday, December 16, 1970.

Critical reception
Overall, Love Story has received generally positive reviews. Rotten Tomatoes retrospectively collected reviews from 29 critics and gave the film a score of 66%. The critical consensus reads: "Earnest and determined to make audiences swoon, Love Story is an unabashed tearjerker that will capture hearts when it isn't inducing eye rolls."

Roger Ebert gave the film four out of four stars and called it "infinitely better than the book," adding, "because Hiller makes the lovers into individuals, of course we're moved by the film's conclusion. Why not?" Charles Champlin of the Los Angeles Times was also positive, writing that although "the plot-line has been honored many times ... It's the telling that matters: the surfaces and the textures and the charm of the actors. And it is hard to see how these quantities could have been significantly improved upon in Love Story."

Newsweek felt the film was contrived and film critic Judith Crist called Love Story "Camille with bullshit". Vincent Canby of The New York Times wrote, "I can't remember any movie of such comparable high-style kitsch since Leo McCarey's Love Affair (1939) and his 1957 remake, An Affair to Remember. The only really depressing thing about 'Love Story' is the thought of all the terrible imitations that will inevitably follow it." Gene Siskel gave the film two stars out of four and wrote that "whereas the novel has a built-in excuse for being spare (it is told strictly as the boy's reminiscence), the film does not. Seeing the characters in the movie ... makes us want to know something about them. We get precious little, and love by fiat doesn't work well in film." Gary Arnold of The Washington Post wrote, "I found this one of the most thoroughly resistible sentimental movies I've ever seen. There is scarcely a character or situation or line in the story that rings true, that suggests real simplicity or generosity of feeling, a sentiment or emotion honestly experienced and expressed." Writer Harlan Ellison wrote in The Other Glass Teat, his book of collected criticism, that it was "shit". John Simon wrote that Love Story was so bad that it never once moved him.

The film was ranked number 9 on the AFI's 100 Years...100 Passions list, which recognizes the top 100 love stories in American cinema. The film also spawned a trove of imitations, parodies, and homages in countless films, having re-energized melodrama on the silver screen, as well as helping to set the template for the modern "chick flick".

Box office
The film was an instant box office smash. It opened in two theatres in New York City, Loew's State I and Tower East, grossing $128,022 in its first week. It expanded into another 166 theatres on Christmas Day and grossed a record $2,463,916 for the weekend, becoming the number-one film in the United States. It also grossed a record $5,007,706 for the week and grossed $2,493,167 the following weekend. It remained number one at the US box office for the next 4 weeks before finishing second behind The Owl and the Pussycat for one week and then returning to the top of the box office for another six weeks. It went into general release in the United States on June 23, 1971 expanding into an additional 143 theatres in New York, Los Angeles, Chicago, Detroit and St Louis, grossing $1,660,761 in five days and returned to number one at the US box office for another 3 weeks, for a total of 15 weeks at number one. It was the sixth highest-grossing film of all time in U.S and Canada with a gross of $106,397,186. Adjusted for inflation, the film remains one of the top 50 domestic grosses of all time. It grossed an additional $67 million in international film markets for a worldwide total of $173.4 million.

Accolades

American Film Institute

Television
The film was first broadcast on ABC television on October 1, 1972 and became the most watched film on television surpassing Ben-Hur with 27 million homes watching, with a score of 42.3 by Nielsen ratings and an audience share of 62%. The rating was equalled the following year by Airport and then surpassed in 1976 by Gone with the Wind.

Harvard College screenings 
The Crimson Key Society, a student association, has sponsored screenings of Love Story during orientation to each incoming class of Harvard College freshmen since the late 1970s. During the showings, society members and other audience members mock, boo, and jeer "maudlin, old-fashioned and just plain schlocky" moments to humorously build school spirit.

Soundtrack
The soundtrack from the film was released separately as an album, and distributed by Quality Records.

Charts

Sequels and remake
O'Neal and Milland reprised their roles for a sequel, Oliver's Story, released in 1978. It was based on Segal's 1977 novel. The film begins with Jenny's funeral, then picks up 18 months later. Oliver is a successful, but unhappy, lawyer in New York. Although still mourning Jenny, he manages to find love with heiress Marcie Bonwit (Candice Bergen). Suffering from comparisons to the original, Oliver's Story did poorly with both audiences and critics.

NBC broadcast Love Story, a short-lived romantic anthology television series, in 1973–1974. Although it shared its name with the novel and movie and used the same theme song – "(Where Do I Begin) Love Story" – as the movie, it otherwise was unrelated to them, with no characters or storylines in common with either the novel or the movie.

The original film was remade in India in the Hindi language entitled Sanam Teri Kasam in 2016. The film is a modern rendition of the novel Love Story by Eric Segal. The film was released worldwide on 5 February 2016 under the production banner of Eros Now.

In February 2021, remodeled ViacomCBS streaming service Paramount+ announced a remake of Love Story as a TV series, to be part of their new lineup of content. The series is to be produced by young adult stalwarts Josh Schwartz and Stephanie Savage, made prominent due to young adult hits such as The O.C., Gossip Girl and Looking for Alaska. It is to be made for Schwartz and Savage's production house, Fake Empire, as a co-production between Paramount Television Studios and CBS Studios.

Ali MacGraw's "disease" 
Vincent Canby wrote in his original New York Times review that it was "as if Jenny was suffering from some vaguely unpleasant Elizabeth Arden treatment". Mad magazine ran a parody of the film ("Lover's Story") in its October 1971 issue, which depicted Ali MacGraw's character as stricken with "Old Movie Disease", an ailment that causes a dying patient to become "more beautiful by the minute". In 1997, Roger Ebert defined "Ali MacGraw's Disease" as a movie illness in which "the only symptom is that the patient grows more beautiful until finally dying".

In popular culture
In 1971, the 20th episode of the fourth season of The Carol Burnett Show featured a take-off of the film called "Lovely Story", with Carol Burnett in the MacGraw role and Harvey Korman in the O'Neal role.

The film's female protagonist has been credited with the spike in the baby name Jennifer in North America in 1970, launching it to the number 1 feminine given name. It would hold this position for 14 years.

In the 3rd episode of the seventh series of Peep Show, Jeremy attempts to participate in a book club discussion about Wuthering Heights without having read it. Confident in the knowledge that Wuthering Heights is a love story he decides to compare it to the film Love Story.  

In 2020, the film's theme music was played during the funeral procession of Iranian General Qasem Soleimani.

In Westworld season 3, the film's theme music is played while a character is on a drug called 'genre' which makes him see the world in different film genres.

In the 1st episode of the eleventh season of Bob's Burgers the cassette tape in Bob's dream says "Being organized means never having to say you're sorry!".

In an interview at the 2022 Toronto International Film Festival, Taylor Swift cited Love Story as an inspiration for the autumnal set design of All Too Well: The Short Film.

Quotations
Two lines from the film have entered popular culture:

The latter is spoken twice in the film, once by Jennifer when Oliver is about to apologize to her for his anger. It is also spoken by Oliver to his father when his father says "I'm sorry" after hearing of Jennifer's death.

The quote made it to No. 13 onto the American Film Institute's AFI's 100 Years ... 100 Movie Quotes, a list of top movie quotes.

The comedy What's Up, Doc? (1972), which stars O'Neal, refers to this line at the end, when Barbra Streisand's character says "Love means never having to say you're sorry", then bats her eyelashes. O'Neal's character responds in deadpan fashion, "That's the dumbest thing I ever heard."

See also
 List of American films of 1970
 A Walk to Remember (2002), a film with a similar theme

References

External links

 
 
 
 Film Rewind: Revisiting Love Story (fan summary) 

1970 films
1970 romantic drama films
1970s American films
American romantic drama films
Best Drama Picture Golden Globe winners
1970s English-language films
Films about cancer
Films about interclass romance
Films about weddings
Films based on American novels
Films based on romance novels
Films directed by Arthur Hiller
Films featuring a Best Drama Actress Golden Globe-winning performance
Films scored by Francis Lai
Films set in Boston
Films set in Harvard University
Films set in New York City
Films that won the Best Original Score Academy Award
Films whose director won the Best Director Golden Globe
Paramount Pictures films
Films about disability